Näsnaren is a lake in Södermanland, Sweden. It is close to the city of Katrineholm, southwest of Stockholm.

Lakes of Södermanland County